The coat of arms of Zagreb in Croatia consists of a three-towered city with a star and a crescent moon overhead. The coat of arms dates back to at least the 18th century.

Description
Against an Azure ground on a Vert hill: an Argent walled moat with three towers and open Or gates. An Or six-pointed star Sinister and an Argent crescent Dexter.

References

External links

Zagreb
Culture in Zagreb
History of Zagreb
Zagreb
Zagreb
Zagreb